Jacob Martin may refer to:
 Jacob Martin (cricketer), Indian cricketer
 Jacob Martin (American football), American football outside linebacker
 Jacob Martin (politician), member of the Alabama legislature
 Jacob L. Martin, American diplomat

See also
 Jakob Martin, American songwriter, performer, and recording artist.